Quoran may refer to:
Alternative spelling of Quran
Of or relating to Quora